The 2001–02 season was FC Metz's 70th season in existence and the club's second consecutive season in the top flight of French football. In addition to the domestic league, Metz participated in this season's edition of the Coupe de France. The season covered the period from 1 July 2001 to 30 June 2002.

Players

First-team squad

Transfers

In

Out

Pre-season and friendlies

Competitions

Overview

Division 1

League table

Results summary

Results by round

Matches

Coupe de France

Coupe de la Ligue

References

FC Metz seasons
Metz